Naked Came the Stranger is a 1969 novel written as a literary hoax poking fun at the American literary culture of its time. Though credited to "Penelope Ashe," it was in fact written by a group of twenty-four journalists led by Newsday columnist Mike McGrady.

McGrady's intention was to write a book that was both deliberately terrible and contained a lot of descriptions of sex, to illustrate the point that popular American literary culture had become mindlessly vulgar. The book fulfilled the authors' expectations and became a bestseller in 1969; they revealed the hoax later that year, further spurring the book's popularity.

Hoax
Mike McGrady was convinced that popular American literary culture had become so base—with the best-seller lists dominated by the likes of Harold Robbins and Jacqueline Susann—that any book could succeed if enough sex was thrown in. To test his theory, in 1966 McGrady recruited a team of Newsday colleagues (according to Andreas Schroder, nineteen men and five women) to collaborate on a sexually explicit novel with no literary or social value whatsoever. McGrady co-edited the project with Harvey Aronson, and among the other collaborators were well-known writers including 1965 Pulitzer Prize winner Gene Goltz, 1970 Pulitzer Prize winner Robert W. Greene, and journalist Marilyn Berger.

The group wrote the book as a deliberately inconsistent hodge-podge, with each chapter written by a different author. Some of the chapters had to be heavily edited, because they were originally too well written. The book was submitted for publication under the pseudonym "Penelope Ashe". (She was portrayed by Billie Young, McGrady's own sister-in-law, for photographs and meetings with publishers.)

The publisher, Lyle Stuart, was an independent publisher then known for controversial books, many with sexual content. According to Stuart, he had appropriated the cover photo (a kneeling nude woman with very long hair down her back, photographed from behind) from a Hungarian nudist magazine; the model and photographer later demanded and received payment.

Synopsis
Gillian and William Blake are the hosts of a popular New York City breakfast radio chat show, The Billy & Gilly Show, where they play the perfect couple.  When Gillian finds out that her husband is having an affair, she decides to cheat on him with a variety of men from their Long Island neighborhood.  Most of the book is taken up by vignettes describing Gilly's adventures with a variety of men, from a progressive rabbi to a mobster.

Reception
The book fulfilled McGrady's cynical expectations, and sales soon reached 20,000 copies, whereupon the co-authors decided to go public, in August 1969. The male authors gave their confession on The David Frost Show, after being introduced as "Penelope Ashe" and walking out on stage, single file, as the orchestra played the song "A Pretty Girl Is Like a Melody". The revelation of the true origins of the book prompted more sales with the book selling approximately 90,000 copies by October 13, 1969. By the end of the year, the book had spent 13 weeks on the New York Times Best-Seller List, although by that time its authorship was common knowledge. It is unclear how much of the book's success was due to its content and how much to publicity about its unusual origin. As of May 2012, the book's publisher reported the book had sold 400,000 copies.

In 1970, McGrady published Stranger Than Naked, or How to Write Dirty Books for Fun and Profit, which told the story of the hoax.

Film

Naked Came the Stranger was adapted in 1975 as directed by Radley Metzger and starring Darby Lloyd Rains. As reported by The Washington Post, "Mr. McGrady and the other writers had nothing to do with the hardcore film with the same title. They did, however, see the movie at a Times Square theater. During one vivid scene, Aronson told The Charlotte Observer, someone shouted 'Author, Author!' 'Seventeen of us stood up.

See also
 Atlanta Nights, a later literary hoax
 I, Libertine, an earlier literary hoax
 Naked Came the Manatee, a 1996 serialized South Florida mystery thriller parody

References

Further reading
 Ashe, Penelope (pseudonym) (1969). Naked Came the Stranger. 
 McGrady, Mike (1970). Stranger Than Naked or How to Write Dirty Books for Fun.

External links

 Twentieth Century Bestsellers—Naked Came the Stranger

1969 American novels
American erotic novels
American novels adapted into films
Barricade Books titles
Collaborative novels
Hoaxes in the United States
Literary forgeries
Novels set in New York City
Works published under a pseudonym